Rivers Casino Philadelphia, formerly SugarHouse Casino, is a casino entertainment development along the Delaware River in Philadelphia, Pennsylvania's Fishtown neighborhood, one of five stand-alone casinos awarded a gaming license on December 20, 2006 by the Pennsylvania Gaming Control Board.

History
SugarHouse Casino was awarded a gaming license on December 20, 2006  by the Pennsylvania Gaming Control Board, along with four others. Many neighborhood residents sought to prevent the development of the casino due to quality of life issues.  Residents of the Fishtown neighborhood have taken the lead in the creation and leadership of the prominent anti-casino organizations, including Casino Free Philadelphia, the Philadelphia Neighborhood Alliance, and Neighbors Allied for the Best Riverfront.  On the other side, Fishtown Action (FACT), the largest membership organization in the nearby community with over 600 members, has continuously supported the casino project.  This support is largely in part because of a community benefits agreement along with the New Kensington CDC.

The  casino complex is located on the  site of the former Jack Frost Sugar Refinery, hence the "SugarHouse" name; and on a site where a British Revolutionary Era fort was once located.  Phase I, estimated at $550 million, includes a casino floor with 3,000 slot machines, and tables, along with a variety of retail and dining outlets.  Future phases of the project include a 500-room hotel with health spa, a  event center, and expanded dining and retail facilities.

It was estimated that SugarHouse Casino would generate in excess of $1 billion in gaming taxes to the Commonwealth of Pennsylvania and the City of Philadelphia over the first five years of operation.

On April 15, 2008, the Pennsylvania Supreme Court convened in Philadelphia to determine if the City of Philadelphia had the right to lease the land where the casino was to be located.  The city's Mayor Nutter revoked the SugarHouse license in January, and the city's lawyers claimed the city never had the authority to issue the license in the first place. The owners of SugarHouse Casino argued that the city could not legally revoke a license to build on the riverbank. On August 22, 2008 the Supreme Court ruled that the permits were legal.

Groundbreaking on the project began on October 9, 2009,  The casino opened on September 23, 2010.

On July 22, 2014, SugarHouse casino broke ground on a project to expand the casino floor, add restaurants, add a parking garage, and bring more amenities to the riverfront.  The expansion opened on May 9, 2016.

SugarHouse began offering online gambling in New Jersey in 2016. In fall 2018, SugarHouse added online sports betting in New Jersey.

On December 13, 2018, sports betting began at SugarHouse Casino with a two-day test period; official sports betting began on December 15, 2018. SugarHouse became the first casino in the Philadelphia area to offer sports betting. The casino initially operated out of a temporary sportsbook.  On May 28, 2019, SugarHouse Casino became the first casino in Pennsylvania to offer online sports betting within the state of Pennsylvania. The permanent $5 million,  BetRivers Sportsbook opened in October 2019, consisting of a large HD video wall that can broadcast multiple games, six betting windows, and 22 self-serve betting kiosks. The casino offers betting on multiple sports including football, basketball, hockey, boxing, and soccer.

In 2019, SugarHouse's parent company, Rush Street Gaming, announced that the casino would be rebranded as Rivers Casino Philadelphia, matching the name used by Rush Street's other properties, including Rivers Casino Pittsburgh. The new name became official on October 29, 2019.

On July 17, 2019, SugarHouse conducted a soft launch for online gambling in Pennsylvania; the testing period lasted two days. Online gambling offered by SugarHouse consists of slot machines and table games, with online poker to launch at a later date.

Dining
Rivers Casino offers the following dining options:
Geno's Steaks
Coffee Spot
The Marketplace
Mian
Jack's Bar & Grill

Entertainment
The Event Center at Rivers Casino is home to concerts and entertainment performances. Free entertainment is also available at Hugo's Frog Bar & Chop House.

Transportation

See also
 List of casinos in Pennsylvania 
 Foxwoods Casino Philadelphia
 Parx Casino and Racing

References

External links
 

Buildings and structures in Philadelphia
Casinos in Pennsylvania
Casinos completed in 2009
2009 establishments in Pennsylvania